Gustavo Adrián Ramos Vásquez (born 22 January 1986), commonly known as Adrián Ramos, is a Colombian footballer who plays as a striker for Colombian club América de Cali.

He made his debut for the Colombia national football team in 2008 and has represented them 37 times, including at the 2011 Copa América and the 2014 FIFA World Cup.

Club career

Hertha Berlin
Ramos started his career at América de Cali but was sent out on loan to Trujillanos FC and Club Santa Fe in consecutive seasons. Ramos returned to América de Cali for the 2008 season and was one of the biggest reasons for the team winning the Mustang Cup in 2008, scoring in their 4–1 aggregate victory over Independiente Medellín. On 30 August 2009, he joined Hertha BSC in Germany after the clubs agreed a fee in the region of €2 million.

His first goal for Hertha came in the second round of the DFB Pokal on 22 September 2009, helping the club come back from 0–2 down to level at 2–2, only to lose in a penalty shoot-out. His first Bundesliga goal came against Stuttgart on 12 November, putting his side ahead before a late Zdravko Kuzmanović strike ensured a 1–1 draw. On 13 December 2013, Ramos scored two goals in nine minutes as Hertha came from 0–1 down to defeat Werder Bremen 3–2. In the 2013–14 Bundesliga season, he had his best season to date with Hertha, contributing 16 goals, the joint fourth most in the league.

Borussia Dortmund
On 9 April 2014, it was announced that Ramos would sign for Borussia Dortmund, joining them on 1 July 2014, moving for an undisclosed fee and penning a four-year contract with the club. Ramos went on to say that he was looking forward to joining his new team, while also stating that he hoped to fill the void left by Robert Lewandowski for the fans.

Ramos made his Dortmund debut on 13 August 2014, coming on as a second-half substitute in Dortmund's 2–0 victory over Bayern Munich in the DFL Supercup. His first Dortmund goal came three days later, scoring Dortmund's final goal of their 4–1 victory over Stuttgart Kickers in the first round of the DFB Pokal. On 29 August, Ramos scored his first league goal for Borussia Dortmund against FC Augsburg, resulting in a 3–2 win, Dortmund's first of the Bundesliga season. On 13 September, Ramos scored his second goal for Dortmund against SC Freiburg and also provided an assist for Shinji Kagawa in a 3–1 win. He scored his first goals in Europe for Dortmund on 1 October, scoring twice after coming on as a substitute in a 3–0 win against Anderlecht in the Champions League.

Granada (loan)
Ramos was loaned out to Granada during the winter transfer window on 24 January 2017.

Chongqing Lifan
Borussia Dortmund announced that Ramos was due to join Chongqing Lifan on 30 June 2017. A fee of €12 million was reported to have been agreed over his transfer.

Granada
In 2018, Ramos signed with Granada after two loan spells.

Return to América de Cali
On 1 January 2020, Ramos returned to Colombia to sign with América de Cali.

International career
He played for Colombia U-17 in the 2003 World Cup and scored three goals. This helped Colombia finish fourth. He received a full international call-up and started for Colombia on 20 August 2008 in a friendly against Ecuador in New Jersey.

On 2 July 2011, Ramos scored the only goal of the game just before half time against Costa Rica in the group stage of the 2011 Copa América in Argentina.

Ramos was included in Colombia's squad for the 2014 FIFA World Cup, their first appearance in the tournament since 1998. He made his first appearance by starting in the last group game with the team already qualified, playing the whole 90 minutes as Colombia beat Japan 4–1. He came on as a substitute in both knockout games as Colombia eventually fell at the quarter-finals, their best performance to date.

International goals
Scores and results lists Colombia's goal tally first.

Career statistics
Updated 23 December 2016.

1Refers as Copa Colombia, Bundesliga Relegation play-off, DFB-Pokal and DFL-Supercup.

2Refers as Copa Libertadores, Copa Sudamericana, UEFA Champions League and Europa League.

Source:

Honours

Club
América de Cali
 Categoría Primera A (2): 2008-II , 2020
Hertha Berlin
 2. Bundesliga (2): 2010–11, 2012–13
Borussia Dortmund
 DFL-Supercup (1): 2014

References

External links
 
 
 
 

1986 births
Living people
Colombian footballers
Colombian expatriate footballers
Colombia international footballers
Colombia youth international footballers
Sportspeople from Cauca Department
2011 Copa América players
2014 FIFA World Cup players
Independiente Santa Fe footballers
América de Cali footballers
Hertha BSC players
Borussia Dortmund players
Granada CF footballers
Trujillanos FC players
Categoría Primera A players
Bundesliga players
2. Bundesliga players
La Liga players
Expatriate footballers in Germany
Expatriate footballers in Venezuela
Expatriate footballers in Spain
Colombian expatriate sportspeople in Spain
Colombian expatriate sportspeople in Germany
Colombian expatriate sportspeople in Venezuela
Association football forwards
Colombian people of African descent